The Klimov M-106 was an experimental liquid-cooled V12 piston aircraft engine intended for Soviet aircraft during World War II.

Development
With the VK-105PF exhausting the potential of the M-105, Klimov prolonged its development into new VK-106 engine from 1941. Since air combat on the Eastern Front took place primarily at low altitudes under  the new engine was built specifically for peak performance at those altitudes with a reduced compression ratio and a single-speed supercharger. Static testing was carried out from 27 October till 9 November 1942. Although reliable and easily installed in M-105-powered aircraft, VK-106 did not enter production because its cooling problems were not solved. Like M-105P, VK-106P could house an autocannon in the "vee" between the cylinder banks.

Applications
Yak-1b with M-106

Specifications (VK-106-1sk)

See also

References

Notes

Bibliography

 Gunston, Bill. World Encyclopedia of Aero Engines. Cambridge, England. Patrick Stephens Limited, 1989. 
 Kotelnikov, Vladimir. Russian Piston Aero Engines. Marlborough, Wiltshire. The Crowood Press Ltd. 2005. .

VK-106
1940s aircraft piston engines